Binibini Gandanghari (born Rustom Cariño Padilla; ; September 4, 1967), commonly known as BB Gandanghari, is a Filipino-American actress, model, entertainer, comedian, and director.

She is the older sibling of actor and current senator Robin Padilla and younger sibling of Royette and Rommel Padilla, all of whom are actors. Gandanghari enjoyed success in Philippine films in the early 1990s (as "Rustom Padilla"), before taking a hiatus in 2001. She returned to prominence in 2006 when she joined the Pinoy Big Brother Celebrity Edition where she came out after 44 days.

In 2009, she came out as trans. In 2016, her registered name and gender were changed by order of the Orange County Superior Court.

Background
Gandanghari entered show business as a matinee idol and later as an action star. She was also the presenter of Philippine franchise for Wheel of Fortune on ABC 5. After her hosting stint, Gandanghari left the Philippines and studied film making in the United States. Gandanghari appeared in the film adaptation of the comic book Zsazsa Zaturnnah (her first film role as a gay man) as the gay salon owner Ada (Adrian), the alter ego of Zsazsa Zaturnnah. She appeared in the television series La Vendetta on GMA 7 and the Happy Hearts, later appearing on the ABS-CBN teleserye, Eva Fonda.

In 2009, Gandanghari hosted the National Kidlat Awards on the resort island of Boracay in Malay, Aklan. She appeared again in SRO Cinema Serye: Rowena Joy. In September 2017, Gandanghari signed with The Brogan Agency in the United States. On August 9, 2019, she made her U.S. television debut in the Netflix series GLOW, where she played a fortune teller named Patricia in the eighth episode of the series' third season.

Personal life
Binibini Gandanghari was born Rustom Cariño Padilla to Roy Padilla Sr. and Lolita Eva (née Cariño). She has seven siblings: three brothers and four sisters. Prior to her public gender transition, Padilla married Carmina Villarroel in 1994; but Villarroel then filed for annulment after several years, which was granted in June 2002.

Gandanghari became one of the 14 housemates in Pinoy Big Brother: Celebrity Edition. On March 2, 2006, she came out as gay on the show. On day 45 of the competition, Gandanghari opted to voluntarily leave the house.

In January 2009, Gandanghari came out as trans, and chose to undergo gender confirmation surgery.  Her brother, action star and senator Robin Padilla, at first said that he fully accepted the decision, but later recanted his earlier statements and admitted that he was still shocked and not on good terms with her. Their mother, and all of Gandanghari's other siblings, still refer to her by her deadname.

Gandanghari stated her full name is derived from the Filipino words Bb. (abbreviation of Binibini, an honorific equivalent to "Miss") and Gandanghari, a portmanteau of the words ganda (beauty) and hari (king), adding that the "Bb." refers to her motto "'Be' all that you can 'be'".

Gandanghari holds a B.A. in economics from Saint Louis University, Baguio and studied filmmaking at UCLA in 2010.

In 2017, Gandanghari reportedly obtained employment as a driver for Uber in the United States.

In 2022, she announced on Instagram that she became a US citizen. Her name is also recognized on her US passport.

Filmography

Television

Film
Onyong Majikero (1991)
Magnong Rehas (1992)
Narito ang Puso Ko (1992)
Ngayon at Kailanman (1992)
Hanggang Saan Hanggang Kailan (1993)
Kapag Iginuhit ang Hatol ng Puso (1993)
Gagay: Prinsesa ng Brownout (1993)
Ikaw (1993)
Kadenang Bulaklak (1994)
Brat Pack (1994)
Hindi Magbabago (1994)
Mistah (1994)
Mars Ravelo's Darna! Ang Pagbabalik (1994)
Marami Ka Pang Kakaining Bigas (1994)
Sana Dalawa ang Puso Ko (1995)
The Jessica Alfaro Story (1995)
Maruja (1996)
Bilang Na ang Araw Mo (1996)
Paano Kung Wala Ka Na (1997)
Abuso: Case #6433 (1997)
Walang Katapusang Init (1998)
Ganito Na Akong Magmahal (1998)
May Isang Pamilya (1999)
Ako'y Ibigin Mo ... Lalaking Matapang (1999)
Bilib Ako Sa'yo (1999)
Ganito Ako Magmahal (1999)
Yamashita: The Tiger's Treasure (2001)
Zsa Zsa Zaturnnah, ze Moveeh (2006)
Happy Hearts (2007)

References

External links
 
 Official website 

1967 births
Living people
Filipino male television actors
Filipino television actresses
Filipino television variety show hosts
Filipino film actors
Filipino film actresses
Transgender actresses
Transgender female models
Filipino LGBT actors
GMA Network personalities
ABS-CBN personalities
Star Magic
TV5 (Philippine TV network) personalities
Pinoy Big Brother contestants
LGBT film directors
Filipino women comedians
Filipino film directors
UCLA Film School alumni
BB
Saint Louis University (Philippines) alumni
21st-century LGBT people
Filipino LGBT comedians